Jennifer Elizabeth Valentyne (née Peck, born May 31, 1967) is a Canadian television personality. Her longest running role was on Breakfast Television in Toronto for 23 years where she went from being a weather specialist to hosting the "Live Eye" and being the stand in co-host. From 2016 to 2020, she had various positions on Corus Entertainment properties, first as the host of The Bachelor & The Bachelorette Canada After Show on W Network (2016-2017), as co-host on Derringer in the Morning on Q107 in Toronto (2017-2019), and co-host of the Toronto edition of Global News Morning (2019-2020).

Education and career
Valentyne graduated from David and Mary Thomson Collegiate Institute and earned a Radio and Television Broadcasting Diploma from Toronto's Centennial College. She began work at City Toronto in 1987, as an intern and then a graphics operator with MuchMusic. In the early 1990s she appeared as "The Prize Queen" on Speakers Corner and hosted 30-second spots called "MuchHappenings". In 1992 she became a regular as the "Singing Weathergirl" on Breakfast Television, where she worked doing "Live Eye" segments and as a fill-in co-host until her position was eliminated in April 2016.

She is a former Toronto Argonauts cheerleader and has posed as the Toronto Suns Sunshine Girl. She is also a singer-songwriter. She sings jazz standards and originals; she sings on BT Holiday Favourites, a CD released by City Toronto in 2007.

Valentyne moved to Corus Entertainment where she became the host of The Bachelorette Canada & The Bachelor Canada After Show on W Network in 2016 and 2017. From February 2017 until February 2019 she was co-host on Derringer in the Morning on Corus-owned Q107.

In March 2019, Valentyne moved to Corus-owned Global News Toronto as a morning co-anchor. Valentyne was laid off by Corus in August 2020.

In May 2022, Valentyne announced, through a video posted to social media, that she had filed a complaint with the Canadian Human Rights Commission (CHRC) alleging gender discrimination by a previous employer. Corus subsequently acknowledged that it was party to a process involving Valentyne and the CHRC, and announced that it had put Derringer in the Morning on hiatus pending the results of an external investigation.

Personal life
She is married to Greg Valentyne, a freelance producer/camera operator and founder of Heroes Beer. They have two children, Jackson and Georgia Valentyne.

References

External links
Jennifer Valentyne at Breakfast Television, archived May 7, 2013.

1967 births
Living people
Canadian Football League cheerleaders
Canadian cheerleaders
Canadian women singers
Canadian television hosts
Centennial College alumni
Musicians from Toronto
Canadian women television hosts